The Murabitun World Movement is an Islamic movement founded by its current leader, Abdalqadir as-Sufi (born as Ian Dallas), with communities in several countries. Its heartland is Spain.  The number of its followers may amount, according to one estimate, to around 10,000.

Background
The name Murabitun derives from the name of the Almoravid dynasty. The founder of the  Murabitun World Movement is Abdalqadir as-Sufi, a convert to Islam born Ian Dallas in Ayr, Scotland, in 1930. He met his first Shaykh, Muhammad ibn al-Habib, in Meknes around 1968, and was made a muqaddam and given the title "as-Sufi". Ibn al-Habib said to him, “You can stay here with me, and something might happen. But go to England and see what will happen”. 

Abdalqadir as-Sufi travelled in Europe and America, held talks, and published works such as The Way of Muhammad and Islam Journal proposing that Islam could be understood, and entered, as the "completion of the Western intellectual and spiritual tradition". He also initiated translations into English of classical texts on Islamic law and Sufism, including the Muwatta Imam Malik.

In 1982 Abdalqadir as-Sufi held a series of talks in America which were to become the basis of his work, Root Islamic Education.

Ideas

Position on zakat

The political and social work of the Murabitun centres around the restoration of the “fallen pillar” of zakat, which, it is claimed, has been abandoned on several primary counts.

Principally:
 that it must be taken by an emir
 that if it consists of money it must be taken in gold and/or silver
 that it must be disbursed immediately.

As their authority for this position the Murabitun cite a wide range of sources, beginning with the Qur'anic injunction to take zakat, the Prophetic practice of zakat-taking, the well-known position of the Khalif Abu Bakr as-Siddiq, and the established practice among the world Muslim community which was until relatively recently the assessment and collection of zakat by the Leader and his collectors.

This they place in contradistinction to the currently prevailing practices of voluntary self-assessment, donation to the zakat charity of one’s choice, and the placement of zakat donations into interim or even long-term investment funds. This, they argue, destroys the political cohesion of the Muslim community, which is based primarily on the circulation of wealth along divinely revealed lines. They also condemn zakat investment funds as un-Islamic.

Shari‘ah currency

They previously connected their position on zakat with promotion of the Islamic gold dinar and silver dirham, which was developed above all by the scholar Umar Ibrahim Vadillo. Paper money, since actually a promise of payment written on paper, can from the point of view of zakat only be considered in terms of its value as paper, since zakat cannot be discharged by passing on a token of debt owed to a third party. Vadillo has written extensively on the origins of paper money and the Islamic position on money.

The Murabitun traced the bi-metallic currency back to Muhammad and the first Muslim community; its specific weights and purities were formally recorded by ‘Umar Ibn al-Khattab.

In February 2014, however, Shaykh Dr. Abdalqadir as-Sufi distanced himself from the dinar and dirham movement, saying, "So, I now dis-associate myself from all activity involving the Islamic gold dinar and silver dirham".

Emirate, sultaniyya and caliphate

The Murabitun advocate personal rule as the Islamic and indeed natural form of human governance, taking authority for this position from extensive Qur'anic references.

‘Amal Ahl al-Madinah

Abdalqadir as-Sufi's advocacy of Malik’s school of Madinah is explained at length in his work Root Islamic Education. The Murabitun do not, however, in any way dispute the validity of the other legal schools, nor is adherence to or advocacy of the madhhab of Malik a condition of membership of the Murabitun.

Islamic trading and social welfare

The Murabitun advocate a revival of the forms of trading and social welfare practiced during the first generations of Muslims and for most of the history of Islam, proposing that these are the natural modes of human activity and rejecting the dialectical categorisation of “ancient” or “modern”, a set of opposites whose application to Islam they consider irrelevant and misleading.

These models have been formulated in detail and include awqaf for the funding of social welfare institutions, mosques and other public facilities.

Position against terrorism

Abdalqadir as-Sufi has consistently identified terrorism and suicide tactics as forbidden in and alien to Islam, and indeed as a phenomenon with no precursor in Muslim history. Instead, he states that its original appearance as a tactic and a psychology was among the Isma‘ili sect of Shi‘a Islam, and that it later emerged among the Russian nihilists of the late 19th century.

Organizational form

The Murabitun organise themselves around emirs. This is distinct from the role of the movement’s founder, Abdalqadir as-Sufi, who, while exercising an undoubted influence, is a spiritual guide rather than a political leader – an arrangement common throughout the history of Islam.

References

Further reading
Website of Abdalqadir as-Sufi
 The Noble Qur'an: a rendering of its meaning in English. Abdalhaqq and Aisha Bewley, (Bookwork, Norwich, UK)
The Way of Muhammad (Diwan Press, 1975, ASIN: B0000D74TC)
The Muwatta of Imam Malik translated by Aisha Bewley and Ya'qub Johnson, (Bookwork, Norwich, UK, 2001)
 The Letters of Shaykh Moulay Muhammad al-Arabi al-Darqawi (published as The Darqawi Way) translated by Aisha Bewley (Diwan Press Norwich, UK, 1980)
Root Islamic Education, written on the school of the people of Madinah under the leadership of Imam Malik (Madina Press, June 1993)

External links
Shaykh Dr. Abdalqadir as-Sufi's Official Website

Metallism
Islamic organizations established in 1968
Islamic organisations based in Spain